The Filmfare Critics Award for Best Actor – South is given by Filmfare as part of its annual Filmfare Awards for South Indian films. The award is given by the chosen jury of critics assigned to the function.

Multiple wins
2 wins :
 Karthi (For Tamil films)
 Arvind Swamy (For Tamil films) 
 Dulquer Salman (One each in Malayalam and Telugu) 
 Nani (For Telugu Films)
 Jayasurya (For Malayalam Films)

List of winners

See also 
Filmfare Critics Award for Best Actress – South

Notes

Filmfare Awards South